Thomas Christian Weller (born 4 November 1980) is a German former professional footballer who plays as a left midfielder or left-back for FC Romanshorn.

Career 
Weller joined FC St. Gallen on 24 October 2007.

He moved to SC Brühl in 2014 to FC United Zürich in 2015, and to FC Kosova Zürich in 2017. He continued his career in the Swiss lower leagues with FC Uster and FC Romanshorn.

Personal 
His father Hanjo Weller previously worked as Head Scout by FC Vaduz.

References

External links

football.ch profile

1980 births
Living people
German footballers
Association football midfielders
Association football fullbacks
TSV 1860 Munich II players
FC Winterthur players
FC Vaduz players
FC Schaffhausen players
Stuttgarter Kickers players
FC St. Gallen players
FC Wohlen players
SC Pfullendorf players
Swiss Super League players
Swiss Promotion League players
Swiss Challenge League players
Regionalliga players
German expatriate footballers
German expatriate sportspeople in Liechtenstein
Expatriate footballers in Liechtenstein
German expatriate sportspeople in Switzerland
Expatriate footballers in Switzerland